Vanneaugobius is a genus of gobies native to the eastern Atlantic Ocean and the Mediterranean Sea.

Species
There are currently three recognized species in this genus:
 Vanneaugobius canariensis Van Tassell, P. J. Miller & Brito, 1988
 Vanneaugobius dollfusi Brownell, 1978
 Vanneaugobius pruvoti (Fage, 1907)

References

Gobiidae